Scarlett is an English name of Norman French origin and is a metonymic occupational surname for a dyer or a seller of rich, brightly coloured cloth, often of a brilliant, vivid red colour. The derivation of the name is from the Old French word "Escarlate", scarlet, which by 1182 was already being used as the name of a cloth, particularly bright red cloth. The ultimate derivation is from the Latin "scarlata". The modern surname can be found in either of two forms: Scarlet or Scarlett.

Notable people
Scarlett is the surname of :

Baron Abinger several people including :
James Scarlett, 1st Baron Abinger (1769–1844)
Robert Scarlett, 2nd Baron Abinger (1794–1861)
William Scarlett, 3rd Baron Abinger (1826–1892)
James Scarlett, 4th Baron Abinger (1871–1903)
Shelley Scarlett, 5th Baron Abinger (1872–1917)
Robert Scarlett, 6th Baron Abinger (1876–1927)
Hugh Scarlett, 7th Baron Abinger (1878–1943)
James Scarlett, 8th Baron Abinger (1914–2002)
 Andre Scarlett (born 1980), English professional footballer
 Austin Scarlett (born 1983), US fashion designers and artists
 Brian Scarlett (1938-2004) British particle technologist
 Connor Scarlett (born 1992), British actor
 Dane Scarlett (born 2004), English professional footballer
 Francis Muir Scarlett (1891–1971), United States District Judge
 Francis Rowland Scarlett (1875–1934), Royal Air Force commander
 Fred Scarlett (born 1975),  British rower
 Hunter Scarlett (1885–1954), American ophthalmologist and college footballer
 James Yorke Scarlett (1799–1871), British general and hero of the Crimean War
 John Scarlett (footballer) (1947–2019), Australian rules footballer
 John Scarlett (Toronto) (1777–1865), Canadian merchant
 John McLeod Scarlett (born 1948), head of the British Secret Intelligence Service, commonly known as MI6
 Ken Scarlett (born 1927), Australian Writer
 Liam Scarlett (1986-2021), British choreographer
 Lynn Scarlett, American environmental policy analyst
 Mary J. Scarlett Dixon (1822-1900), American physician
 Matthew Scarlett (born 1979), Australian footballer 
 Niara Scarlett, British singer-songwriter
 Peter Campbell Scarlett (1804–1881), British diplomat
 Sir Peter W.S.Y. Scarlett (1905–1987), British diplomat
 Reginald Scarlett (1934-2019), West Indian cricketer
 Robert Scarlett (born 1979), Jamaican footballer
 Robert Dalley-Scarlett (1887–1959), Australian organist, choirmaster and composer
 Ron Scarlett (1911–2002), New Zealand paleozoologist
 Sir William Anglin Scarlett (1777–1831), Chief Justice of Jamaica

Fictional Characters

 Miss Scarlett, one of six original Cluedo characters
 Captain Carlos Scarlett, title character of the 1953 film Captain Scarlett
 Remilia Scarlet and Flandre Scarlet, from the Japanese video game franchise Touhou Project
 Will Scarlet, one of Robin Hood's "Merry Men"
 Eliza Scarlet, title character from television series Miss Scarlet and The Duke

See also
Scarlett (disambiguation)

References